Frank Wheeler Hotel, also known as the Brown-Wheeler House, is a historic hotel building located at Freetown in Pershing Township, Jackson County, Indiana.  It was built in 1890, and is a modest two-story, Queen Anne style frame building.  The building features asymmetrical massing, multiple gables, and a large porch with turned and decorative woodwork.  Also on the property are the contributing shed and privy.  Built as a private dwelling, it housed a hotel from 1905 to 1938.

It was listed on the National Register of Historic Places in 1991.

References

Houses on the National Register of Historic Places in Indiana
Hotel buildings on the National Register of Historic Places in Indiana
Queen Anne architecture in Indiana
Houses completed in 1890
Buildings and structures in Jackson County, Indiana
National Register of Historic Places in Jackson County, Indiana